Amok is a 1983 Moroccan drama film directed by Souheil Ben-Barka. It won the Golden Prize at the 13th Moscow International Film Festival. Borrowing heavily of Alan Paton's Cry, the beloved country but putting the action in the context of the Soweto uprising, it tells the initiating journey of an old teacher from a backward Natal village to the conflict-ridden modern Johannesburg.

Cast
 Robert Liensol as Mathieu Sempala
 Miriam Makeba as Joséphine Sempala
 Douta Seck as Reverend Sikau Norje
 Richard Harrison as Elton Horn
 Gianni Garko
 George Ardisson
 Edmund Purdom as Jaarsveld
 Claudio Gora as M. Horn

References

External links
 

1983 films
1983 drama films
Guinean drama films
1980s French-language films
Moroccan drama films
Senegalese drama films